Sculcoates railway station was a railway station on the North Eastern Railway's Victoria Dock Branch Line in Hull, East Riding of Yorkshire, England. It was first opened by the York and North Midland Railway on 1 June 1853 and closed in November 1854. It was reopened in August 1865, before closing permanently on 9 June 1912.

The station has been demolished but an associated railway goods shed remains in use by a road haulage firm.

References

Disused railway stations in Kingston upon Hull
Railway stations in Great Britain opened in 1853
Railway stations in Great Britain closed in 1912
Former York and North Midland Railway stations
Hull and Holderness Railway
Hull and Hornsea Railway
Sculcoates